Lignerolles is the name or part of the name of several communes in France:

 Lignerolles, Allier
 Lignerolles, Côte-d'Or
 Lignerolles, Eure
 Lignerolles, Indre
 Lignerolles, Orne